The Sumatran trogon (Apalharpactes mackloti) is a species of bird in the family Trogonidae. It was formerly considered conspecific with the Javan trogon under the common name blue-tailed trogon.

It is endemic to the Indonesian island of Sumatra. Its natural habitat is subtropical or tropical moist montane forest. They inhabit forests throughout the southern Asian mainland and the Greater Sunda and Philippine islands along with the other 11 species of Asian trogons. No trogons are present on the Sundaic island of Palawan, and none have succeeded in colonizing islands east of Wallace’s Line.

Sumatran Trogons are still-hunting predators that wait motionless on a branch until prey is spotted, then they attack. Their diet  varies and includes insects, fruit, and small vertebrates that will fit within their beak. The leg muscles are also so reduced that they cannot walk, or even turn around on a perch without using their wings.

Description 
The male is blue-grey with a red beak and a pale blue patch of skin around the eye.

References

Sumatran trogon
Birds of Sumatra
Sumatran trogon
Taxonomy articles created by Polbot